Thomas Demarest House was located in Englewood, Bergen County, New Jersey, United States. The house was built in 1803 and was added to the National Register of Historic Places on January 9, 1983. The house was demolished in May 1995 by a developer and replaced by a non-descript commercial building.

See also
National Register of Historic Places listings in Bergen County, New Jersey

References

Englewood, New Jersey
Houses on the National Register of Historic Places in New Jersey
Houses completed in 1803
Houses in Bergen County, New Jersey
National Register of Historic Places in Bergen County, New Jersey
New Jersey Register of Historic Places
Demolished buildings and structures in New Jersey
Buildings and structures demolished in 1995